LunaCorp, was a small but ambitious private company headed by its former president David Gump, established in 1989. It was designed around a privately funded mission, using Russian technology, to put a rover on the Moon.  The aim for the company was to fund the mission by the entertainment value of having customers drive the rover. The program's advisor was Dr. Buzz Aldrin, who, together with Neil Armstrong, walked on the surface of the Moon in 1969 during the first manned lunar mission.
After producing no tangible results the company was dissolved in 2003.

The details of the mission evolved with time.  Because the Moon is hotter than boiling water at noon and colder than liquid nitrogen at night, in the final version of the design the robot would avoid those extremes by circumnavigating the Moon every 29.5 days (the length of a lunar day) to stay in sunlight, a strategy originally proposed by Geoffrey Landis. "Our robot, by driving completely around the Moon at a high latitude at only a few kilometers per hour, will enjoy lunar morning temperatures all the time by staying in sync with the sun", said the mission's controller.

References

External links
LunaCorp press release (2000) from Space Frontiers.org
Snapshots of LunaCorp History, 2007.
Interview:  LunaCorp and Orbital Outfitters, Daily Spaceflight News, 15 December 2010.

Private spaceflight companies
Companies disestablished in 2003
Defunct spaceflight companies